Tony Evans may refer to:

Sports

Tony Evans (Australian footballer born 1966), former Australian rules footballer with St Kilda and Footscray
Tony Evans (Australian footballer born 1969), former Australian rules footballer with the West Coast Eagles
Tony Evans (footballer, born 1954), English footballer for Cardiff City and Birmingham City
Tony Evans (footballer, born 1960), English footballer for Colchester United
Tony Evans (New Zealand footballer), New Zealand international football (soccer) player

Others
Tony Evans (pastor), Christian pastor and a radio broadcaster
Tony Evans (EastEnders), a fictional character in soap opera, EastEnders

See also 
Anthony Evans (disambiguation)